Limnaecia bisignis is a moth of the family Cosmopterigidae. It is known from Australia.

References

Limnaecia
Moths described in 1921
Moths of Australia
Taxa named by Edward Meyrick